Eetu Huuhtanen (born 31 January 2003) is a Finnish professional footballer, who plays as a goalkeeper for Finnish premier division club Ilves.

References 

2003 births
Living people
Finnish footballers
Association football goalkeepers
FC Ilves players
Kakkonen players
Veikkausliiga players